Leonard Crunelle (July 8, 1872 in Lens, Pas-de-Calais – 1944) was a French-born American sculptor especially known for his sculptures of children. Crunelle immigrated with his family to the United States and worked as a coal miner in Decatur, Illinois.
Lorado Taft discovered him as a youth and brought him to Chicago where he was an apprentice to the sculptors decorating the 1893 World's Fair Horticultural Exhibit. He studied at the Art Institute of Chicago with Taft.

Gallery

References

External links

Public Art in Chicago
http://www.lib.niu.edu/2007/ih030720.html
 

1872 births
1944 deaths
People from Lens, Pas-de-Calais
French emigrants to the United States
20th-century American sculptors
American male sculptors
20th-century American male artists